Cyperus nipponicus is a species of sedge that is native to parts of south eastern Russia, China and Japan.

See also 
 List of Cyperus species

References 

nipponicus
Plants described in 1878
Flora of Japan
Flora of China
Flora of Russia
 Taxa named by Adrien René Franchet